Sergey Nikolaevich Burdin (born 2 March 1970) is a retired Russian football player. He played for Russian clubs CSKA Moscow, Chernomorets Novorossiysk, Gazovik-Gazprom Izhevsk and South Korean clubs Bucheon SK (currently Jeju United FC), Seongnam Ilhwa Chunma.

Honours
 Russian First Division Zone West top scorer: 1993 (25 goals).

External links
 

1970 births
Living people
Association football forwards
Russian footballers
Russian expatriate footballers
PFC CSKA Moscow players
FC Chernomorets Novorossiysk players
Jeju United FC players
Seongnam FC players
Russian Premier League players
K League 1 players
Expatriate footballers in South Korea
FC Rubin Kazan players
Russian expatriate sportspeople in South Korea
FC Volgar Astrakhan players
Sportspeople from Perm, Russia
FC Iskra Smolensk players
FC Zvezda Perm players